John Barron may refer to:

 John Barron (academic) (1934–2008), British classical scholar
 John Barron (actor) (1920–2004), English actor, best known for The Fall and Rise of Reginald Perrin
 John Barron (footballer) (1879–1908), Scottish footballer
 John Barron (hurler) (1934–2008), Irish sportsman
 John Barron (journalist) (1930–2005), American journalist who wrote about the Cold War and Soviet Union
 John Augustus Barron (1850–1936), Canadian politician and lawyer
 John Hall Barron (1873–1951), British philatelist
 John Barron, co-host of Planet America, an Australian television news program on ABC News 24
 John Barron, publisher and former editor of the Chicago Sun-Times
 John Barron, plaintiff in the Supreme Court case Barron v. Baltimore
 John Barron (pseudonym), a pseudonym used by Donald Trump in the 1980s

See also
 John Shepherd-Barron (1925–2010), British inventor
 John Baron (disambiguation)
 John Barran (disambiguation)
 Jon Barron